Caribou Lake may refer to the following lakes:

 Caribou Lake (Temagami), Ontario, Canada
 Caribou Lake (North Bay, Ontario), Canada
 Caribou Lake (Chaudières-Appalaches), Quebec, Canada
 Caribou Lake (California), the lake in Caribou Wilderness from which the area gets its name